{{DISPLAYTITLE:C13H18N2}}
The molecular formula C13H18N2 may refer to:

 Methylethyltryptamines
 N-Methyl-N-ethyltryptamine
 4-Methyl-α-ethyltryptamine
 7-Methyl-α-ethyltryptamine
 TC-1698
 Trimethyltryptamines
 α,N,N-Trimethyltryptamine
 2,N,N-Trimethyltryptamine
 5,N,N-Trimethyltryptamine
 7,N,N-Trimethyltryptamine